Seraikela Sadar subdivision is an administrative subdivision of the Seraikela Kharsawan district in the Kolhan division in the state of Jharkhand, India.

Administrative set up 
Seraikela Kharsawan district has two subdivisions – (1) Seraikela Sadar subdivision with Seraikela, Kharsawan, Kuchai, Adityapur and Gobindpur CD blocks, and (2) Chandil subdivision with Chandil, Ichagarh, Kukru and Nimdih CD blocks.

The subdivisions of Seraikela Kharsawan district have the following distinctions:

Note: Calculated on the basis of block-wise data available.

Police stations 
Police stations in Seraikela Sadar subdivision are at: 
Adityapur 
Gamharia 
Kandra 
Kharswan 
Kuchai 
Rajnagar 
Seraikela 
RIT PS 
Traffic PS, Gamharia

Blocks 
Community development blocks in the Seraikela Sadar subdivision are:

Education 
In 2011, in Seraikela Sadar subdivision out of a total 828 inhabited villages there were 82 villages with pre-primary schools, 727 villages with primary schools, 334 villages with middle schools, 51 villages with secondary schools, 25 villages with senior secondary schools, 101 villages with no educational facility. 
.*Senior secondary schools are also known as Inter colleges in Jharkhand

Educational institutions 
The following institutions are located in Seraikela Sadar subdivision:

 National Institute of Technology Jamshedpur, an Institute of National Importance established at Adityapur in 1960, has the status of a Deemed University.
 Srinath University is a private institution at Dindli, Adityapur with diverse educational programmes.
 Arka Jain University, is a private university at Mohanpur, Gamahria, established in 2011.
 Government Polytechnic, established at Adityapur in 1980, offers diploma courses in engineering.
 MSME Tool Room (Indo Danish Tool Room), Jamshedpur Main Centre, located at Gamharia, offers diploma, certificate and skill development programmes.
 XITE (Xavier Institute of Tribal Education) College was established at Gamharia by the Jamshedpur Jesuit Society in 2003.
 Kashi Sahu College was established at Seraikela in 1969.
 Model Mahila College at Kharsawan was established in 2016.

(Information about degree colleges with proper reference may be added here)

Healthcare 
In 2011, in Seraikela Sadar subdivision there were 14 villages primary health centres, 16 villages with primary health subcentres, 113 villages with maternity and child welfare centres, 15 villages with allopathic hospitals, 8 villages with dispensaries, 4 villages with veterinary hospitals, 6 villages with family welfare centres, 132 villages with medicine shops. 
.*Private medical practitioners, alternative medicine etc. not included

Medical facilities

(Anybody having referenced information about location of government/ private medical facilities may please add it here)

References 

 

Sub-divisions in Jharkhand